Tomasz Bednarek and Mateusz Kowalczyk were the defending champions, but they didn't compete together
Bednarek played with Mischa Zverev and Kowalczyk partnered with Lukáš Rosol, but they lost in the first round.
Dustin Brown and Rogier Wassen defeated Rameez Junaid and Philipp Marx 6–4, 7–5 to win the final.

Seeds

Draw

Draw

External links
 Main Draw

Pekao Open - Doubles
2010 Doubles
2010 in Polish tennis